Michael Anthony Cronin (born 1 October 1960) is an Irish academic specialist in culture, travel literature, translation studies and the Irish language. He is the current holder of the Chair of French (established 1776) at Trinity College Dublin, Ireland. Cronin is a member of the Royal Irish Academy.

Biography
He was born on 1 October 1960   holds a BA in French and English from Trinity College Dublin in 1982, a MA from University College Dublin and a Ph.D awarded in 1991 from Trinity College Dublin with a thesis "Ludic elements in the prose fiction of Réjean Ducharme and Gérard Bessette"  

He is co-editor of The Irish Review. 

He was elected a member of the Royal Irish Academy in 2008, and held the post of its  Humanities Secretary.

He is also the  Chairperson of Poetry Ireland.

He was appointed to the Ambassadors Chair at KU Leuven for the 2019-2020 academic year.

Published works
Books  written by Michael Cronin include:
 Irish and Ecology / An Ghaeilge agus an Éiceolaíocht. Dublin: Foilseacháin Ábhair Spioradálta, 2019. 
 Eco-Translation: Translation and Ecology in the Age of the Anthropocene. Milton Park, Abingdon, Oxon: Routledge, 2017. 
 Translation in the Digital Age. Milton Park, Abingdon, Oxon: Routledge, 2013. 
 Arabic translation published as الترجمة في العصر الرقمي  Translated by Dr. Mubarak Alkhatnai of King Saud University, Riyadh, Saudi Arabia 
 Polish translation published as Przekład w epoce cyfrowej, translated by Marta Błaszkowska, Magda Heydel, Elżbieta Koziołkiewicz, Maciej Nawrocki, Aldona Pikul, Zofia Ziemann, Kraków: Wydawnictwo Uniwersytetu Jagiellońskiego, 2016
 Translation Goes to the Movies. New York, NY: Routledge, 2009.  
 Translation and Identity. London: Routledge, 2006 
  Irish in the New Century. Dublin: Cois Life, 2005
 Translation and Globalization, Routledge, 2003.  According to WorldCat, the book is held in 281  libraries  
Arabic translation published as الترجمة والعولمة / al-Tarjamah wa-al-ʻawlamah 
Japanese translation published as 翻訳とグローバリゼーション : 新翻訳事始め / Hon'yaku to gurōbarizēshon : Shin hon'yaku kotohajime 
 (with  Barbara O'Connor) Irish Tourism: Image, Culture and Identity, Channel View Publications, 2003.   According to WorldCat, the book is held in 591 libraries  
 Time Tracks: Scenes from the Irish Everyday, New Island, 2003.
 Irish Tourism: Image, Culture and Identity, Cork University Press, 2002.
 (with Cormac Ó Cuilleanáin) The Languages of Ireland, Four Courts Press, 2002.
 Translating Tomorrow: Translation, Technology and Interculturality in a Global Age], Routledge, 2002.
 Across the Lines: Travel, Language, Translation, Cork University Press, 2000.
 Unity in Diversity? Current Trends in Translation Studies, St Jerome Press, 1998.
 Anthologie des nouvelles irlandaises, L'Instant meme, 1997.
 Translating Ireland: Translation, Languages and Identity, Cork University Press, 1996.
 Tourism in Ireland: A Critical Analysis, Cork University Press, 1993.

Books edited by him include: 
 The Languages of Ireland, Four Courts Press, 2003. 
 Reinventing Ireland: Culture, Society and the Global Economy, Pluto Press, 2002.

References

External links
 Official site
 Home Page at Trinity College Dublin

Irish translation scholars
Alumni of Trinity College Dublin
Alumni of University College Dublin
Members of the Royal Irish Academy
1960 births
Living people